Euscirrhopterus gloveri, the purslane moth, is an owlet moth (family Noctuidae). The species was first described by Augustus Radcliffe Grote and Coleman Townsend Robinson in 1868. It is found in North America.

The MONA or Hodges number for Euscirrhopterus gloveri is 9307.

References

Further reading

External links
 

Agaristinae
Articles created by Qbugbot
Moths described in 1868